Bambusa basisolida is a species of Bambusa bamboo.

Distribution
Bambusa basisolida is commonly found in Guangdong province of China.

References

basisolida
Flora of Guangdong
Plants described in 1997